A corps of cadets, also called cadet corps, was originally a kind of military school for boys. Initially such schools admitted only sons of the nobility or gentry, but in time many of the schools were opened also to members of other social classes. Since the 1800s "corps of cadets" has referred to the student body of cadets at a military academy.

History

Origins 
The original Cadets de Gascogne corps was established by King Louis XIII of France for younger sons of Gascon gentry (in the Gascon language, capdets—"little chiefs"). This idea of a school for boys who would later become gentlemen volunteers in the army to offset their lack of patrimony, soon spread, with similar schools being established in other European countries.

Expansion

Germanic countries 
Notable cadet-corps schools were created by the "Great Elector" Frederick William I of Brandenburg, in Kolberg, Berlin, and Magdeburg. In 1716 the 1st Kolberg corps of about seventy cadets was relocated to the Royal Prussian Cadet Corps in Berlin. Based at the newly erected Kadettenhaus, it became the main education centre of Prussian Army officers under "Soldier King" Frederick William I. Further cadet schools were established in Stolp (1769), Kulm (1776), Potsdam, and Kalisch (1793). The educational system was largely reorganised by officers like Ernst von Rüchel, Gerhard von Scharnhorst, August Neidhardt von Gneisenau, and Hermann von Boyen in the course of the 19th century Prussian Reforms. In 1878 the Hauptkadettenanstalt moved to Lichterfelde in the southwestern suburbs of Berlin.

The aristocratic Ritter-Akademie (knight academy) in Liegnitz, Silesia, established in 1708, had a similar concept. Based on the Prussian model, cadet schools were founded by the Saxon Army in 1725 at Dresden and by the Bavarian Army at Munich in 1755. A Württemberg military college (Kriegsschule) was founded in 1820 at Ludwigsburg. In the Austrian Empire, Cadeten-Institute were established in Hainburg, Eisenstadt, Marburg, and Rijeka, where officer candidates prepared for military academy attendance.

Russia 

A first Russian Cadet Corps was created by Empress Anna at Saint Petersburg in 1731.

Poland-Lithuania 
The Corps of Cadets was established at Warsaw for Lithuanian and Polish nobles in 1765 by King Stanisław August Poniatowski.

Japan 
Similar institutions comprise the Imperial Japanese Army Academy established in 1868.

United States 
The students at the United States Military Academy at West Point—a four-year military college that was established by President Thomas Jefferson in 1802—are referred to as "cadets", and collectively, the cadet brigade is known as the United States Corps of Cadets. The cadet regiment at the United States Coast Guard Academy is similarly styled as the United States Coast Guard Corps of Cadets. The United States Naval Academy maintains a similar Brigade of Midshipmen, while the United States Air Force Academy cadets are part of the United States Air Force Cadet Wing. The Citadel established in 1842 also has a corps of cadets and is one of the largest among the Senior Military Colleges of the United States.

Established in 1876, the Texas A&M University Corps of Cadets is another notable corps of cadets.

Canada 
Likewise, Upper Canada College, in Toronto, Ontario, maintained a cadet corps from 1832 to 1976.

Modern cadet corps 

 Texas A&M University Corps of Cadets

 Cadet Corps, Kazakhstan
Kronstadt Sea Cadet Corps
Navy League Cadet Corps (Canada)
National Cadet Corps (Sri Lanka)
National Cadet Corps (India)
National Cadet Corps (Singapore)
Armed Forces Academies Preparatory School, Thailand

See also
Kadetten

References 

School types
Military academies